Roorkee Legislative Assembly constituency is one of the seventy electoral Uttarakhand Legislative Assembly constituencies of Uttarakhand state in India. It includes Roorkee area.

Roorkee Legislative Assembly constituency is a part of Haridwar (Lok Sabha constituency).

Members of Legislative Assembly

Election results

2022

References

External links
  

Haridwar
Assembly constituencies of Uttarakhand